Half Cut Tea is a web-series dedicated to the understanding and exploration of artists through short documentary videos. The series is produced by a two-person team (Jordan Wayne Long and Matt Glass) that travels the country looking for artists and telling their stories through short documentary films. Episodes from the series have been licensed to several programs across the world including KCET's Artbound and Belgium's Lust For Life.

History
The first season was released in early 2013. It consisted of 8 episodes featuring a wide variety of artists from performance artists to a puppeteer working at a burlesque night club in Los Angeles. For Season Two, Half Cut Tea raised money through Kickstarter where in exchange, donators received DVD copies of Season One and CDs of the soundtrack.

Season Two of Half Cut Tea began in July 2013. The first episode got the attention of several press outlets including MSNBC and Yahoo who described it by saying:
"... the glass cabin and the video are an inspiring story about youth and dreams."

In the months that followed, Half Cut Tea released an episode ever two weeks for the rest of the year. The series featured a variety of artists including actor/director Sandeep Parikh and inventor/tinkerer JJ Dasher.

The Company Half Cut Tea has expanded its reach into both Fiction content and Music Videos. The creators of Half Cut Tea, Matt Glass and Jordan Wayne Long, started HCT.media in 2015. Their clients include The Jim Henson Company, BBC, NPR, KCET, LINK TV and more. Their work has been featured in The No Budget Film Festival for the past two years.

Episodes

Season 1 (2013)

Season 2 (2013)

Music
For each episode, Matt Glass creates an original song based around of the artist. These songs quickly become available on bandcamp, when the episodes are released.

References

External links
Half Cut Tea
Half Cut Tea's youtube page
Half Cut Tea on IMDB

2013 web series debuts